The VEF I-19 was a 1939 Latvian fighter aircraft designed by Karlis Irbitis, based on the earlier I-16. It was never built due to the fact that Latvia was occupied by the Soviet Union on June 17, 1940.

See also

References

1930s Latvian fighter aircraft
Low-wing aircraft
Single-engined tractor aircraft
VEF aircraft